Bosaso, historically known as Bender Cassim is a city in the northeastern Bari province (gobol) of Somalia. It is the seat of the Bosaso District. Located on the southern coast of the Gulf of Aden, the municipality serves as the region's commercial capital and is a major seaport within the autonomous Puntland state.

It has an estimated population of around 164,906 residents (2005 est.). The city has a diverse economy centred on education, government, banking, tourism, aviation, food, clothes, logistics, steel, energy, health care, hospitality, retail and technology. The area's many colleges and universities make it a regional hub of higher education, including law, medicine, engineering, business and entrepreneurship.

History

The Periplus of the Erythraean Sea indicates that Ancient Greek merchants sailed to Bosaso, providing notes about the strategic and geographical location of the current Bosaso area, which was known as Mosylon in ancient times.

Previously Bosaso was known as Bandar Qasim, a name derived from an Ahmed Harti first trader of the same name who is said to have settled in the area during the 14th century.

The Italian explorer Giulio Baldacci who travelled along Somali coasts in 1906–1909 said:
"About  hours' walk from Bet Nur, we came to Bander Kasnin (also called by the Arabs: the native name is Bosaso), which was built about sixty years ago, the Kaptallah (a seafaring tribe, now almost extinct) being the first to build few huts there. They were joined by, not long after, by the Deshishe"
Historically, Bosaso has been a Dishiishe Darod stronghold.

Near Bosaso, at the end of the Baalade valley, lies a  earthwork. Local tradition recounts that the massive embankment marks the grave of a community matriarch. It is the largest such structure in the wider Horn region.

Since centuries the city was among the areas ruled by the Dishiishe clan. Later forming a part of Italian Somaliland, Bosaso was represented in the parliament of the succeeding Trust Territory of Somalia by the MPs Ugas Yasin Ugas Abdurahman and Haji Bashir Ismail Yusuf. The town would eventually be administered through the official Bari region in the post-independence period.
Barkhad Ali Salah served as first mayor of the town.

Geography

Location and habitat
Bosaso is situated in northeastern Somalia, on the Gulf of Aden coast. Nearby settlements include to the east Rehiss, to the northeast Marero, to the west Baalade, to the southwest Laas Geel, to the south Lasgoriga, and to the southeast El Dhurre. The largest cities in the country most proximate to Bosaso are Erigavo, Burao, and Berbera.

In June 2014, the Puntland government launched a new tree-planting campaign in the state, with the regional Ministry of Environment, Wildlife and Tourism slated to plant 25,000 trees by the end of the year. Bosaso is among the seven cities and towns earmarked for the reforestation initiative, which also include Garowe, Qardho, Dhahar, Buuhoodle, Baran and Galkayo. The campaign is part of a broader partnership between the Puntland authorities and EU to set up various environmental protection measures in the region, with the aim of promoting reforestation and afforestation.

Climate
Bosaso has a hot desert climate (Köppen climate classification BWh). It has a mean annual relative humidity of around 60%. The weather slowly heats up in the spring, as the April rainy season begins. Average high temperatures later peak during the summer months of June to August, when they consistently exceed . Come September, cooler weather starts to set in again.

Demographics

Bosaso's total population is estimated at around 164,906 residents (2005 est.).

Furthermore, Bosaso is a major port for boats carrying emigrants from within the country as well as adjacent territories across the Gulf of Aden to settle (sometimes illegally) in the Persian Gulf states.

While Bosaso today is a melting pot, with residents hailing from many different parts of Somalia, most of the city's population is from the Harti Warsangali, majeerten and dashiishe confederation of Darod sub-clans.

Municipality

Bosaso city affairs are managed by the Bosaso Municipality, its leadership is appointed by members of the area's 29 District Councilors. The municipal authority is currently led by Mayor Abdisalam Bashiir Abdisalam who succeeded Yasin Mire Mohamud who himself succeeded Hassan Abdallah Hassan in office.

Each of the city's various districts also has its own municipal sub-authorities, complete with a mayor and civil servants.

Economy
Bosaso is a city that is experiencing rapid growth. Prior to the Somali civil war, it had a population of under 50,000 inhabitants. Since the conflict, Somalis belonging to the Harti Darod sub-clans began migrating back to their ancestral areas of Puntland. As a consequence of these migrations, Bosaso's population and the local housing industry have grown tremendously.

In December 2011, a new commercial market opened in Bosaso's northern Dayaha ("Star") neighborhood, near the port. Approximately  in size, it was designed to ensure easy vehicle access. The market is the result of careful planning between Puntland government officials and civil society representatives. In September 2013, Puntland Minister of Fisheries Mohamed Farah Adan also announced that the Ministry in conjunction with the FAO would open a new fish market in the city, complete with modern refrigerators.

Bosaso is home to Golis Telecom Somalia, the largest telecommunications operator in northeastern Somalia. Founded in 2002 with the objective of supplying the country with GSM mobile services, fixed line and internet services, it has an extensive network that covers all of the nation's major cities and more than 40 districts in both Puntland and Somaliland. According to The Economist, Golis offers one of the cheapest international calling rates on the planet, at US$0.2 less than anywhere else in the world. In addition, Netco has its headquarters in the city. Other telecommunication firms serving the region include Telcom and NationLink.

In September 2013, Puntland Deputy Minister of Environment Burhan Elmi Hirsi also announced a plan by the Puntland government to establish a gas manufacturing plant in Bosaso. The new project is part of a broader campaign by the Puntland environmental authorities to avert deforestation and promote alternative sources of fuel.

The Hafun Fishing Company was established in 1992 in Bosaso. It was named after the northeastern port town of Hafun, where HFC also has an office. The firm exports a wide range of fish products, which it mainly sends to partners in the Middle East. The company is exploring additional global markets for its fish goods. It also maintains commercial interests in Puntland's housing market, which are represented by the firm's growing local real estate sales and development division.

Additionally, the Bosaso Tannery is based in the city. A ten-year-old manufacturing, distributing, wholesale and import/export company, it processes wet salted, dry salted, wet blue, limed, pickled, and air/frame dried sheep and goat hides and skin. Principle wet blue exports are to Turkey, Pakistan, India and China. Raw camel hides and sheep and goat skin are also exported to the United Arab Emirates.

Commercial banks serving Bosaso include Amal Bank and Salaam Bank. Salaam Bank provides personal banking and corporate banking services. Its Islamic banking services and facilities include Mudarabah, Murabaha, Musharakah and Istisnaa. Additionally, the bank offers electronic banking, SMS banking, mobile banking and internet debit. In August 2011, the bank also launched an independent (Kaaftoon) service partnering with Golis Telecom Somalia.

Transportation

It connects major cities in the northern part of the country, such as Galkayo and Garowe, with towns in the south. In June 2012, the Puntland Highway Authority (PHA) launched an upgrade and repair project on the large thoroughfare between Bosaso and Garowe. The transportation body also began rehabilitation work in October 2012 on the central artery linking the city with Qardho. Additionally, plans are in the works to construct new roads connecting littoral towns in the region to the main highway. In June 2014, Puntland President Abdiweli Mohamed Ali along with Bosaso Mayor Hassan Abdallah Hassan and other state officials also inaugurated a new  paved road in the city. The construction project leads to the Bosaso seaport, and was completed in conjunction with UNHABITAT. According to Ali, his administration plans to invest at least 23 million Euros in contributions from international partners in similar road infrastructure development initiatives.

The city has a major seaport, the Port of Bosaso. It was constructed during the mid-1980s by the Siad Barre administration for annual livestock shipments to the Middle East. In January 2012, a renovation project was launched, with KMC contracted to upgrade the Bosaso Port's harbor. The initiative's first phase saw the clean-up of unwanted materials from the dockyard and was completed within the month. The second phase involves the reconstruction of the port's adjoining seabed, with the objective of accommodating larger ships.

Besides its busy seaport, Bosaso has a major airport, the Bender Qassim International Airport. In 2008, the Puntland government signed a multimillion-dollar deal with Dubai's Lootah Group, a regional industrial group operating in the Middle East and Africa. According to the agreement, the first phase of the investment is worth Dhs170m ($46.28m) and will see a set of new companies established to operate, manage and build Bosaso's free trade zone and sea and airport facilities. The Bosaso Airport Company is slated to develop the airport complex to meet international standards, including a new  runway, main and auxiliary buildings, taxi and apron areas, and security perimeters. In December 2014, the foundation stone for a new runway was also laid at the airport.

Education

Bosaso has a number of academic institutions. According to the Puntland Ministry of Education, there are 74 primary schools in the Bosaso District. Among these are the Iftin School, Alfurqan, Umul-Qura and Garisa. Secondary schools in the area include Hamdan, Shafi'i, Ugaas Yasin, Najah, Bosaso and Haji Yasin.

Tertiary education is provided by Bosaso College (BC), as well as the Puntland Nursing Institute (PNI). East Africa University (EAU) also has a Bosaso branch, one of its seven campuses in Puntland. Additionally, the Sam Greathouse School of Modern Technology (SG-SMT) has been working with the local government to construct a large scale dial-up network linking Bosaso to other northern Somali cities, including Berbera and Las Anod.

Panorama

Tourist Attractions

Biyo Kulule is a hot spring located southeast of the city,  outside the city.

Mareero located ( eastern direction of Bosaso, it is known for its white sand beach.

Ga’a, Laag, Karin, Yalho among other places all are considered as places to visit.

Media
Bosaso is home to a number of private media outlets. Radio Daljir, Puntland's largest radio station, has its main headquarters in the city. The broadcaster's network of 7 FM transmitters reaches most of Puntland as well as part of the neighboring Galmudug region to the south. Also centered in Bosaso with its studios in Garowe is the Somali Broadcasting Corporation (SBC), Puntland's oldest and second largest private radio station. Additionally, Horseed Radio, Al Xigma, and One Nation Radio have headquarters in the city. In May 2013, Radio Garowe likewise launched a new FM station in Bosaso.

The city also has its own private television channels and studios, the Eastern Television Network (ETN TV) and SBC TV.

Districts
Bosaso is subdivided into sixteen administrative districts.

Sister cities

On 12 August 2016 Mayor Yasin Mire Mohamud of Bosaso and Mayor Betsy Hodges of Minneapolis jointly signed the memorandum of understanding that formalizes the Sister City relationship, the agreement was previously approved by Minneapolis council later embraced by Bosaso local council.

See also
Garowe-Bosaso Highway
Somali Architecture

References

Sources

Bosaso - Coordinates

External links
Bosaso Municipality
Bosaso, Somalia

 
Populated places in Bari, Somalia
Populated coastal places in Somalia
Gulf of Aden